Alessandro da Col and Andrea Stoppini were the defending champions.
Kevin Anderson and Ryler DeHeart won in the final 6–4, 4–6, [10–6], against Amir Hadad and Harel Levy.

Seeds

Draw

Draw

References
 Doubles Draw
 Qualifying Draw

Fifth Third Bank Tennis Championships - Doubles
2009 MD